The HVDC Troll is a bipolar high-voltage direct current (HVDC) electric power transmission line for the supply of the gas compressor station on the offshore construction work Troll A platform. The HVDC Troll has a maximum transmission rate of  

In 2013 work started on a new rectifier station at Kollsnes for supplying the two new compressors being installed on Troll A.

Sites

External links 

 Troll HVDC Light transmission, Norway, The ABB Group.

Electrical interconnectors in the North Sea
Electric power infrastructure in Norway
HVDC transmission lines
2005 establishments in Norway
Energy infrastructure completed in 2005